H. Briggs (given name unknown) was a British tennis player residing in Paris, France.

Briggs won the singles event of the inaugural Amateur French Championships in 1891 which took place on the grounds of the Cercle des Sport de l'Île de Puteaux. In the final he defeated P. Baigneres in straight sets. As a member of the Club Stade Français, he was entitled to participate in the tournament, which until 1925 was open only to tennis players who were members of French clubs.

Grand Slam finals

Singles: 1 (1-0)

References

19th-century British people
19th-century male tennis players
British expatriates in France
British male tennis players
French Championships (tennis) champions
Year of death missing
19th-century births
Place of birth missing